The Scottish Housing Regulator (SHR) is an independent Non-Ministerial Department, directly accountable to the Scottish Parliament. The body was established on 1 April 2011 under the Housing (Scotland) Act 2010. SHR is the successor to the previous Scottish Housing Regulator agency, which exercised Scottish Ministers' powers under the Housing (Scotland) Act 2001.

The statutory objective of SHR is to:
safeguard and promote the interests of current and future tenants of social landlords, people who are or may become homeless, and people who use housing services provided by Registered Social Landlords (RSLs) and local authorities

SHR regulates social landlords to protect the interests of people who receive services from them. SHR does this by assessing and reporting on; how social landlords are performing their housing services, RSLs’ financial well-being and RSLs' standards of governance and where necessary SHR will intervene to secure improvements.

SHR also keeps a Register of all the RSLs in Scotland. The register holds information about each landlord including their contact details and their regulation plans.

In June 2015 SHR won two awards for its IT systems in recognition of its efforts to make information available to tenants to allow them to hold their landlords to account.

See also
Homelessness in Scotland
Housing and Regeneration Directorate
Local government of Scotland

References

External links
 

2011 establishments in Scotland
Organisations based in Glasgow
Housing in Scotland
Homelessness in Scotland
Local government in Scotland
Housing
Non-ministerial departments of the Scottish Government
Public housing in Scotland
Social programs